Porto de Mós (officially Porto de Mós - São João Batista e São Pedro) is a civil parish in the municipality of Porto de Mós, Portugal. The population in 2021 was 6,001, in an area of 28.19 km2. It was formed on 28 January 2013 by the merging of freguesias São João Batista and São Pedro.

References 

Parishes of Porto de Mós